The United Chiefs and Councils of Manitoulin is a tribal council based on and around Manitoulin Island in Ontario, Canada.

Its affiliate members include:
Aundeck Omni Kaning First Nation
M'Chigeeng First Nation
Sheguiandah First Nation
Sheshegwaning First Nation
Whitefish River First Nation
Zhiibaahaasing First Nation

See also
Kenjgewin Teg Educational Institute

External links
United Chiefs and Councils of Manitoulin

First Nations tribal councils